The Shire of Kojonup is a local government area in the Great Southern region of Western Australia, about  southeast of the state capital, Perth, along Albany Highway.

History

The Kojonup Road District was created on 5 December 1871. On 1 July 1961, it became the Shire of Kojonup following the passage of the Local Government Act 1960, which reformed all remaining road districts into shires.

Wards
The shire has no wards, and all councillors serve 4-year terms. Previously, it was divided into 5 wards:

 Kojonup Ward (3 councillors)
 Balgarup Ward (2 councillors)
 Muradup Ward (2 councillors)
 Ongerup Ward (2 councillors)
 Namarillup Ward (2 councillors)

(Note: The town of Ongerup, unrelated to the ward, is located within the Shire of Gnowangerup.)

Towns and localities
The towns and localities of the Shire of Kojonup with population and size figures based on the most recent Australian census:

Heritage-listed places

As of 2023, 91 places are heritage-listed in the Shire of Kojonup, of which three are on the State Register of Heritage Places, one of three being the Carrolup Native Settlement.

References

External links
 

Kojonup